Raffaele "Raff" Ciccone (born 1 November 1983) is an Australian politician who is a Senator for Victoria, representing the Australian Labor Party. He was appointed to the Senate on 6 March 2019 following the resignation of Jacinta Collins, becoming the 100th Senator to represent the state of Victoria.

Personal life 
Ciccone lived with his parents and brother in the Melbourne suburb of Oakleigh. His parents immigrated to Australia from Italy in the 1960s. 

He received his education at a local Catholic primary school, then at Salesian College in Chadstone. Ciccone went on to study for degrees, first in arts, then commerce, from Deakin University and the University of Melbourne. 

Following graduation, Ciccone initially worked in financial planning. Then, he moved to industrial relations and employment law, becoming a senior official in the Shop, Distributive and Allied Employees Association (SDA). The role allowed him to advocate for workers in the retail sector, including fast food, convenience store and warehouse workers. Notably, this included marginalised workers who had been underpaid by 7-Eleven. 

Ciccone was elected to the board of Link Health and Community in 2009, and from December 2017 served as the organisation's chair.

Ciccone was married to Dimity Paul, who was chief of staff to Victorian government minister Adem Somyurek and stood as a Labor candidate at the 2014 state election.

Politics 
Ciccone joined the Australian Labor Party in 2000 and, whilst studying, worked as a research officer to Senator Jacinta Collins. As a party volunteer, he eventually became the vice-president of the Australian Labor Party in Victoria. He was defeated in his first three attempts in elections, at the Monash City Council elections of 2008 and 2016, and on Labor's Senate ticket in Victoria prior to the 2013 federal election. When Senator Collins announced she would not be contesting the seat at the 2019 federal election, it created a casual vacancy and Ciccone put his name forward for the position.

Ciccone was appointed to the Senate on 6 March 2019, taking Collins' place, making him the 100th Senator to represent Victoria. In the 46th Parliament of Australia, he served as Deputy Opposition Whip in the Senate and on the Parliament's Joint Standing Committees on Migration and on Treaties and became Chair of the Senate Select Committee on Temporary Migration.  

From 2020 Ciccone has also served on the Joint Standing Committee on Trade and Investment and Growth. Ciccone was the Vice-Chair of the Australia-Italy Parliamentary Network Group and continues to be the Co-Chair of the Parliamentary Friends of Landcare. Since 2021, Ciccone has been a member of the Senate Legal and Constitutional Affairs Committee  and the Senate Rural and Regional Affairs and Transport Committee.  On 7 August 2020, Ciccone was appointed to the ALP's national executive.

Following the 2022 federal election, Ciccone became Government Deputy Whip in the Senate and was elected Chair of the Senate Foreign Affairs, Defence and Trade Legislation Committee. He was also appointed to the Parliamentary Joint Committee on Intelligence and Security and the Joint Standing Committee on Foreign Affairs, Defence and Trade Legislation Committee.

On 9 April 2022 Ciccone was awarded honorary membership of the Hawthorn branch of the Returned and Services League for advocacy of veterans’ welfare and the establishment of a Royal Commission into Defence and Veteran Suicide.

Political views

Foreign policy 
In October 2020 it was reported that Ciccone had joined an informal cross-party grouping of parliamentarians, known as the "Wolverines", who are considered to be anti-China. By 2022, he was known to be a member of the Inter-Parliamentary Alliance on China. Ciccone has argued for Australia’s agriculture industry to be considered with national security.

Environment and energy 
Ciccone has strongly supported Australia's timber industry, arguing the industry can help to reduce the country's carbon emissions. He has criticised the Labor government in Victoria for their decision to phase out native forest harvesting by 2030. He is connected to a pro-resources grouping of his party, known as the Otis Group, and has argued against the ALP's opposition to nuclear power in Australia. He has argued that carbon emissions from agriculture should be reduced, requiring collaboration between government and the agricultural industry. Ciccone has criticised climate change activists for arguing that environmental interests and industry interests are opposed.

Industrial relations 
Ciccone has advocated stronger penalties against employers committing wage theft, a rise in unemployment benefits and for greater protection of rights for gig workers.

References

Australian trade unionists
Members of the Australian Senate
Australian Labor Party members of the Parliament of Australia
Labor Right politicians
Australian people of Italian descent
Deakin University alumni
University of Melbourne alumni
1983 births
Living people
People from the City of Monash
Politicians from Melbourne